Saar-Warndt coal mining basin is an area of Germany and France. It has been shaped by two centuries of coal extraction from the start of the 19th century to the start of the 21st century; and it represents a significant period in the history of European industrialisation.

Control over the Saar coalfield passed between France and Germany during the 1900s. After World War One it was agreed in the Treaty of Versailles to be owned by France, until a plebiscite took place 15 years later where the local citizens voted to become part of Germany. Following World War Two this area was officially returned to France, however, the Saar rejoined Germany in 1957.

This piece of land was valuable to these countries, especially during the coal-powered period of history. However, most of the coal in that area was mined when it belonged to France post-WW1.

See also

 Territory of the Saar Basin
 Saarland

References

Coal mining regions in France
Coal mining regions in Germany